Zoltán Pogátsa (born 1974) is a Hungarian political economist and lecturer at the University of West Hungary, focusing on the economics of European integration.
He has published six books and numerous professional and media articles, and is a regular commentator in Hungarian and international media on issues related to European integration and economic development. His book Heterodox International Political Economics, offers a number of different perspectives on understanding the global economy of the 21st century.

In 2013 he spent a year on a Greek government research grant in Athens. He summarised his inquiries into the Greek crisis in a book entitled The Political Economy of the Greek Crisis.

References

External links
Personal homepage

1974 births
Hungarian educators
Hungarian writers
Hungarian economists
Public economists
Living people